Sinomicrobium soli is a Gram-negative bacterium from the genus of Sinomicrobium which has been isolated from soil from the arctic.

References

Flavobacteria
Bacteria described in 2019